is a station located in Suita, Osaka Prefecture, Japan.

Lines
Hankyu Senri Line

History
When the line opened in 1921 the stations were called Nishi-Suita Station and Higashi-Suita Station. In 1943 they were renamed Shiyakushomae Station and Suita Station respectively. When the stations of the line were realigned on April 10, 1964, both stations were discontinued and the new Suita Station was built, reusing and expanding the facilities of former Shiyakushomae Station.

Stations next to Suita

References

External links
 Suita Station from Hankyu Railway website

Railway stations in Japan opened in 1964
Railway stations in Osaka Prefecture